This is a list of Where on Earth is Carmen Sandiego? episodes. The show ran for a total of four seasons from 1994 to 1999. The first three seasons ran their episodes weekly, while the fourth season had a season premiere in September 1996, a 1996 Halloween special, then a three-part episode that aired mid-1998, and the final four episodes airing late 1998 to early 1999.

The episodes were aired out of their production order and intended broadcast order. As a result, episodes from one production season would sometimes air before all of the episodes from the previous season had aired, leaving the seasons without well-defined start or end dates, and using airdate alone to determine what season an episode belongs to is impossible. However, the seasons can be distinguished by their different intros and outros, and by their bookends around commercial breaks, and the order in which they appear on the DVD releases matches what is known about the production codes, implying that the DVD order is correct.

Series overview 
This list goes by the original, intended production season DVD order, and ignores the order of broadcast.

Episodes

Season 1 (1994)

Season 2 (1995)

Season 3 (1995)

Season 4 (1996–99)

References 

Carmen Sandiego
Where on Earth is Carmen Sandiego?